Single Ladies is an American dramedy series which premiered on VH1 on May 30, 2011, and aired for four seasons, ending on April 22, 2015. The series follows the relationships of three friends, Val (Stacey Dash), Keisha (LisaRaye McCoy), and April (Charity Shea), and later Raquel (Denise Vasi).

Series overview

{| class="wikitable" style="text-align: center;"
|-
! style="padding: 0 8px;" colspan="2" rowspan="2"| Season
! style="padding: 0 8px;" rowspan="2"| Episodes
! colspan="2"| Originally aired
! colspan="1"| DVD release date
|-
! style="padding: 0 8px;"| Season premiere
! style="padding: 0 8px;"| Season finale
! style="padding: 0 8px;"| Region 1
|-
 |style="background: #220084;"|
 |1
 |11
 |
 |
 |
|-
 |style="background: #eccb1d;"|
 |2
 |14
 |
 |
 |
|-
|style="background: #5C98EC;"|
 |3
 |12
 |
 |
 |
|-
|style="background:#7A8DFD;"|
 |4
 |6
 |
 |
 |
|}

Episodes

Season 1 (2011)

Season 2 (2012)

Season 3 (2014)

Season 4 (2015)
The season premiere of Single Ladies was simulcast on Centric and BET. The BET 10pm airing received 774,000 viewers, and the Centric 10pm airing received 167,000 viewers. The 11pm repeat on Centric had 202,000 viewers.

References

External links

Lists of American comedy-drama television series episodes